Louis Fierens (14 October 1875 – 1967) was a Belgian archer. He competed at the 1920 Summer Olympics, winning three medals, two gold and a silver.

References

External links
 

1875 births
1967 deaths
Belgian male archers
Olympic archers of Belgium
Archers at the 1920 Summer Olympics
People from Duffel
Olympic gold medalists for Belgium
Olympic silver medalists for Belgium
Olympic medalists in archery
Medalists at the 1920 Summer Olympics
Sportspeople from Antwerp Province
20th-century Belgian people